Peter Bragdon is a Republican former member of the New Hampshire Senate, representing the 11th District from 2004 through 2014. Previously he was a member of the New Hampshire House of Representatives from 2000 until 2002. Bragdon was President of the New Hampshire State Senate from December 1, 2010, through August 27, 2013.

Education 
Bragdon holds a bachelor's degree in math and computer science from the University of Massachusetts Lowell.

Career

Political career 
Bragdon stepped down as president of the New Hampshire Senate on August 27, 2013, and was succeeded by Chuck Morse.

Additional affiliations 
Bragdon was owner and publisher of The Milford Observer.

References

External links
The New Hampshire Senate - Senator Peter Bragdon official government website
Project Vote Smart - Senator Peter E. Bragdon (NH) profile
Follow the Money - Peter Bragdon
2006 20042002 2000 campaign contributions

Living people
Republican Party members of the New Hampshire House of Representatives
Republican Party New Hampshire state senators
University of Massachusetts Lowell alumni
Presidents of the New Hampshire Senate
People from Amherst, New Hampshire
Year of birth missing (living people)